Mammillaria albiflora is a species of plant in the family Cactaceae. It is endemic to Guanajuato state in central Mexico.  Its natural habitat is hot deserts. It is a Critically endangered species, threatened by habitat loss.

References

albiflora
Cacti of Mexico
Endemic flora of Mexico
Flora of Guanajuato
Critically endangered plants
Endangered biota of Mexico
Taxonomy articles created by Polbot